Rajeev Kanakala (born 13 November 1968) is an Indian actor who works predominantly in Telugu films and television. He started his career in television serials and short films, where he not only acted but also produced and directed. He is married to Suma Kanakala since 1999, who is an actress and TV anchor.

In 2013, he started a production house along with his wife which produces TV series.

Filmography

References

External links

Rajeev Kanakala on Instagram
 Rajeev Kanakala on Telugu Filmnagar

Living people
Telugu people
Indian male film actors
Male actors in Telugu cinema
20th-century Indian male actors
21st-century Indian male actors
Male actors from Hyderabad, India
1969 births